The Flight in the Night (1987) is an Iranian film by the director Rasool Mollagholi Poor. A war movie set during the Iran-Iraq war, it belongs to the Sacred Defence genre. It has Farajollah Salahshoor in the lead role. The movie won the Crystal Simorgh for Best Picture.

References

Iranian war drama films
1987 films
1980s Persian-language films
Crystal Simorgh for Best Film winners